Cécile Sarah Hartog (1857–1940) was an English composer and pianist, born in London. She was the daughter of French school teacher, author and editor Marion Moss Hartog, and her siblings were Héléna Arsène Darmesteter, Marcus Hartog, Numa Edward Hartog, and Philip Hartog. Hertha Ayrton was her cousin.

She studied music with Charles Salaman, and later at the Royal Academy of Music, where she took the gold medal for composition in 1889 and had a piano quartet performed, as well as an orchestral Andante and Gavotte. Her teachers there and elsewhere included Frederick Cowen, Woldemar Bargiel, Oscar Beringer, and (in Berlin) Karl Klindworth. She was active as a soloist and sometimes conductor from the 1880s until the First World War. She also taught harmony at the Maida Vale High School for Girls in London.

While conducting the orchestra for the play Beethoven's Romance at the Royalty Theatre on 1 December 1894, the sleeve of her muslin dress was set alight by one of the lamps on her music desk. A member of the orchestra managed to extinguish it quickly with an opera cloak, which may have saved her life. Press reports said she was nevertheless severely injured.

As a composer she wrote solo piano music, a Barcarolle in G minor and the two Chateaux en Espagne for clarinet and piano, and songs, including settings of The Years at the Spring (Browning, performed at The Proms in 1909), Northern Song (Lang), Sunset (Zangwill), Snow May Drift (Heine), and Song of the Jewish Soldier (Alice Lucas). A song book for children, Barbara's Song Book, with illustrations by John Hassall, was published in 1900. She also composed incidental music for plays, such as the music for The Fairies' Jest, and Other Plays for Boys by Amy H Langdon, (1906).

She was also the author of the article 'Poets of Provence' in the Contemporary Review, October, 1894. In later life she lived at 12, Horbury Crescent, London W11.

References

External links 
 Cecile Hartog: works for clarinet and piano, part of a lecture recital by Peter Cigleris, 7 March 2022
 Berceuse for piano as published in The Girl's Own Paper (1886)
 Summer Song for piano, as published in The Girl's Own Paper (1891)

1857 births
1940 deaths
English pianists
English composers
Women composers
20th-century classical composers
20th-century classical pianists
20th-century English musicians
20th-century English women musicians
20th-century women composers
19th-century classical composers
19th-century classical pianists
19th-century English musicians
19th-century women composers
British women classical composers
English classical composers
English classical pianists
English women pianists
Academics of the Royal Academy of Music
Women conductors (music)
19th-century women pianists
20th-century women pianists